Andrea Jenna is a Canadian television host, actress and spokesperson.  She currently hosts the programming block Cant Miss Thursdays on Teletoon and Yahoo! Canada's food series The Perfect Bite.

Early life and education 

Andrea is from Markham, Ontario, Canada.  She studied Media, Information & Technoculture at Western University, and specialized in Broadcast Journalism at Fanshawe College.

Career

Teletoon 

In 2011 Andrea was hired to co-host a one-day broadcast event on Teletoon for the launch of Cant Miss Thursdays new programming lineup.  In the fall of 2012, she became the first-ever host of Teletoon's Cant Miss Thursdays block for kids every Thursday from 6 p.m. to 8 p.m. ET/PT.

The Grammys 

Scouted over Twitter by the social media team for The Recording Academy, she was chosen to co-host the behind the scenes live webcast during The GRAMMY Nominations Concert Live!- Countdown to Music's Biggest Night on November 30, 2011. Coverage included reactions and interviews with nominees of the 54th Annual Grammy Awards.  Some notable interviews included: LL Cool J, Bruno Mars, Katy Perry, Jason Aldean, and The Civil Wars

Sportsnet 

In August 2012 Andrea joined the sports show Cricket Central covering the ICC World T20 on Sportsnet as host of The FanZone.

Yahoo Canada 

In November 2012 Andrea became host of Yahoo Canada's original food series The Perfect Bite.   In 2013, The Perfect Bite was nominated for a Digi Award for Best in Web Series Non-Fiction.

On August 15, 2013, Andrea hosted Yahoo! Canada's live stream of The Mortal Instruments, City of Bones Toronto Premiere. 
 Interviews on the red carpet included: Lily Collins, Jamie Campbell Bower, Robert Sheehan, Kevin Zegers, Harald Zwart.

References

External links 

University of Western Ontario alumni
Canadian VJs (media personalities)
Canadian television hosts
Canadian infotainers
Canadian women television hosts